The Gropa family was an Albanian noble family which ruled the region between Pogradec, Ohrid and Debar in the period 12th — 14th century.
In the 13th century members of Gropa family were thought to be Catholics, but in the 14th century they reconverted to Orthodoxy because of the political relations with Archbishopric of Ohrid. Gropa means "pit" in Albanian.

History
At the beginning of the 13th century, Pal Gropa, an Albanian nobleman, held the Byzantine title of Sevast. As part of the Kingdom of Albania, Pal Gropa was given extended privileges by Charles I of Naples on May 18, 1273: "nobili viro sevasto Paulo Gropa »casalia Radicis maioris et Radicis minons, пeс non Cobocheste, Zuadigorica, Sirclani et Craye, Zessizan sitam in valle de Ebu".  A member of Gropa family, Andrea Gropa, ruled the region and the city of Ohrid as an ally of King of Serbia Vukašin Mrnjavčević until his death in 1371 and later was in rivalry with his son Prince Marko. Ruling as an independent ruler since the time of Vukasin he became de juro independent from Prince Marko in 1371 and was referred to as Župan and Gospodar of Ohrid (Lord of Ochrid). He joined the Albanian ruler and noble Andrea II Muzaka, and managed to take Kostur, Prilep and all Dibër region from Marko by that year. During Andrea's reign, the Gropa family forged their own coins. The Gropa family were believed to have taken part in the Balkan coalition of the Battle of Kosovo against the Ottomans.

Zacharia Gropa is mentioned by Athanase Gegaj as one of the military commanders of Skanderbeg's forces. The Gropa family's descendants were located in Sicily at the end of the 15th century, and would later be found all over southern Italy  and in Zakynthos in Greece.

Members
Pal Gropa (fl. 1273), vassal to Charles I of Naples in Kingdom of Albania
Andrea Gropa (fl. 1377–1385), vassal to Serbian King Vukašin and Marko, later Ottoman Empire
Zacharia Gropa (fl. 1457), associate of Moisi Dibra.
Aidin Gropa, Lord of Vrezhda sometime during the 14th century.

References

Sources

Gropa family
Medieval Ohrid
People from medieval Macedonia